The Livo is an Italian river that arises at an elevation of about  in the alpine basin of Lake Darengo, northwest of Lake Como. The river runs through the homonymous valley and flows into Lake Como in Domaso.

Rivers of Italy
Rivers of Lombardy
Rivers of the Province of Lecco
Rivers of the Province of Como